Dongsheng is a district of Ordos City, Inner Mongolia, PRC.

Dongsheng may also refer to the following locations in the PRC:

 Dongsheng, Beijing (东升地区), area of Haidian District

Towns 
Written as "":
 Dongsheng, Guangdong, in Zhongshan
 Dongsheng, Hubei, in Shishou, Jingzhou, Hubei
 Dongsheng, Jiangxi, in Pengze County
 Dongsheng, Nanchong, in Yingshan County, Sichuan

Townships 
Written as "东胜乡":
 Dongsheng Township, Bei'an, Heilongjiang
 Dongsheng Township, Baicheng, in Taobei District, Baicheng, Jilin
 Dongsheng Township, Anyue County, Sichuan

Written as "东升乡":
 Dongsheng Township, Gansu, in Jingyuan County
 Dongsheng Township, Wangkui County, Heilongjiang
 Dongsheng Township, Taonan, Jilin

Subdistricts 
 Dongsheng Subdistrict, Gaobeidian (东盛街道), Hebei
 Dongsheng Subdistrict, Changchun (东盛街道), in Erdao District
 Dongsheng Subdistrict, Ningbo (东胜街道), in Yinzhou District

Written as "东升街道":
 Dongsheng Subdistrict, Bengbu, in Longzihu District, Bengbu, Anhui
 Dongsheng Subdistrict, Fuzhou, in Cangshan District
 Dongsheng Subdistrict, Nancha District, Yichun, Heilongjiang
 Dongsheng Subdistrict, Yichun District, Yichun, Heilongjiang
 Dongsheng Subdistrict, Shuangliu District, Chengdu, Sichuan